Dan Göran Kristian Bergström (born 8 January 1974) is a Swedish former footballer. He played for Åtvidabergs FF during the more part of his career. He won two caps for the Sweden national team in 2001.

On 1 November 2014, Bergström became the oldest goalscorer in Allsvenskan history when he scored in Åtvidaberg's 2-1 win against Malmö FF, aged 40 years and 297 days.

References

External links
 
 Eliteprospects profile

1974 births
Åtvidabergs FF players
IFK Norrköping players
Malmö FF players
Allsvenskan players
Superettan players
Swedish footballers
Living people
Sweden international footballers
Association football midfielders